Cirsium eriophorum, the woolly thistle, is a herbaceous biennial species of flowering plant in the genus Cirsium of the family Asteraceae. It is widespread across much of Europe. It is a large biennial plant with sharp spines on the tips of the leaves, and long, woolly hairs on much of the foliage. The flower heads are large and nearly spherical, with spines on the outside and many purple disc florets but no ray florets.

Description
The strong, branched stem is densely woolly hairy but has no wings. The leaf margins are rolled over and the underside of the leaf is felted with white hair. These are globular and densely covered with woolly hair. They contain many tubular florets, with long purple tubes and purple stamens, each with a spiny bract covered with white wool through which a spine projects. The flowers are rich in nectar and attract bees, flies, beetles, butterflies and moths.

Distribution and habitat
Cirsium eriophorum has a Central and Western Europe distribution. Its range extends from Upper Volga and the Balkans to the Netherlands, France and Britain. It typically grows in grassland, scrubland and open woodland on chalk, limestone or alkaline clay soils, including the disturbed ground caused by quarrying.

Uses
The young leaves of C. eriophorum can be eaten raw, and the young stems can be peeled and eaten raw or cooked, after being soaked in water to remove their bitterness. The flower buds can be used in a similar way to artichokes but smaller, and an edible oil can be extracted from the seeds. The pappus can be used as tinder for lighting fires.

The plant is hardy and can be easily grown in a sunny position in the garden, in a wildflower meadow or in dappled shade in a woodland garden. It flowers between July and September.

References

External links

 Photo of herbarium specimen at Missouri Botanical Garden
 Online Atlas of the British and Irish Flora in English with photo
 Czech Botany in Czech with photos
 Tela Botanica in French with photos
  Gesamtverzeichnis des Herbariums  besteht aus drei Spezialverzeichnissen: Cirsium eriophorum, Wollköpfige Kratzdistel in German with photo
 Terra Alapítvány, Növény adatlap, Cirsium eriophorum, Gyapjas aszat in Hungarian with photos

eriophorum
Flora of Europe
Plants described in 1753
Taxa named by Carl Linnaeus
Taxa named by Giovanni Antonio Scopoli